The Glasgow Royal Infirmary (GRI) is a large teaching hospital. It is managed by NHS Greater Glasgow and Clyde. It was originally opened in 1794, with the present main building dating from 1914.

History

Founding of the infirmary

A Royal Charter was obtained in 1791 granting the Crown-owned land to the hospital. The infirmary was built beside Glasgow Cathedral on land that held the ruins of the Bishop's Castle, which dated from at least the 13th century but had been allowed to fall into disrepair. George Jardine, Professor of Logic, was appointed the first manager in January 1793.

Designed by Robert and James Adam, the original Royal Infirmary building was opened in December 1794. The original Adams building had five floors (one underground) holding eight wards (giving the hospital just over a hundred beds) and a circular operating room on the fourth floor with a glazed dome ceiling. After a number of additional buildings were added, the first in 1816, a specialist fever block in 1829 and a surgical block in 1860.

St Mungo's College Medical School
St Mungo's College Medical School was set up in 1876 by the medical teachers of the Glasgow Royal Infirmary, after the university had migrated westwards and set up the new Western Infirmary for clinical teaching. At first their students could not take the university examinations. St Mungo's College also had a non-university law school, which prepared accountants and law agents but not advocates. In 1947 it was absorbed into the University of Glasgow's Faculty of Medicine.

New building
The original Adams building was replaced with a new building designed by James Miller and opened by King George V in July 1914. In 1926, the surgical block in which Joseph Lister had worked was also torn down for replacement.

Post-war redevelopment
Following the amalgamation of the old St. Mungo's College of Medicine into the University of Glasgow Medical School in 1947, the old College buildings on Castle Street officially became part of the hospital campus. In 1948 the hospital became part of NHS Scotland.

Visions of a brand new hospital on the site had been part of the Bruce Report as early as the late 1940s, but by 1974, the Greater Glasgow Health Board had formally begun plans for the replacement of the 1914 Miller buildings with a brand new building.  This would be located on the north of the hospital site overlooking Alexandra Parade and the M8 motorway. The new building was designed by Sir Basil Spence in a "modular" fashion, where new blocks could be easily added in phases as funding allowed. In the end, only the first phase of Spence's original design was implemented and was finally completed around 1982. It also incorporated new accommodation for the hospital's teaching departments, thus replacing the old St. Mungo's College buildings. The new complex was linked to the Surgical Block of the original Royal Infirmary building at basement level via a link corridor, with a further pedestrian entrance at lower basement level on Wishart Street (adjacent to the Necropolis). The new facility was officially named the "Queen Elizabeth Building" by the Queen on a visit in July 1986. Since 1982 the pre-1915 buildings of the Infirmary have been protected as a category B listed building.

After the closure of the Rutherglen Maternity Hospital and the old Glasgow Royal Maternity Hospital at Rottenrow, a new maternity block was added to the New Building; the Princess Royal Maternity Hospital opened in 2001. Following the closure of Canniesburn Hospital, the Jubilee Building was opened, adding purpose-built Accident & Emergency facilities and a plastic surgery unit, in November 2002.

Following the transfer of the Golden Jubilee Hospital (formerly the HCI Hospital) in Clydebank to public ownership, much of the cardiology specialism was moved from GRI to the newer facility.

Notable staff and research

In 1856, Joseph Lister became an assistant surgeon at the Infirmary and a professor of surgery in 1860. Running the new surgery block, Lister noted that about half of his patients died from sepsis. Lister experimented to find ways to prevent sepsis. This experimentation lead to using carbolic acid to clean instruments; he is now considered the "father of modern surgery".

In 1875, a student of Lister, William Macewen joined the Infirmary surgery as an assistant surgeon, becoming a full surgeon in 1877. While at the Infirmary he introduced the practice of doctors wearing sterilisable white coats and pioneered operations on the brain for tumours, abscesses and trauma.

In 1896, John Macintyre, Medical Electrician at the Infirmary, opened one of the first radiological departments in the world.

In 1908, one of MacEwen's students James Pringle, developed the Pringle manoeuvre which is used to control bleeding during liver surgery.

In the 1950s Professor Ian Donald, working in the field of obstetrics and gynaecology, was one of the pioneers of diagnostic ultrasound.

References

Further reading
 Blakemore, Colin; Jenneth, Sheila (2001). The Oxford Companion to the Body. Oxford University. .
 Foreman, Carol (2003). Lost Glasgow. Birlinn. .
 Jenkinson, Jacqueline (1994). The Royal: The History of Glasgow Royal Infirmary, 1794-1994 Bicentenary Committee on behalf of Glasgow Royal Infirmary NHS Trust 
 Pittock, Murray G. H. (2003). A New History of Scotland. Sutton. .
 Williams, David (1999). The Glasgow Guide. Birlinn.

External links
 Engraving of Glasgow Infirmary by James Fittler in the digitised copy of Scotia Depicta, or the antiquities, castles, public buildings, noblemen and gentlemen's seats, cities, towns and picturesque scenery of Scotland, 1804 at National Library of Scotland

Hospital buildings completed in 1914
Hospitals in Glasgow
NHS Scotland hospitals
Teaching hospitals in Scotland
1794 establishments in Scotland
James Miller buildings
Category B listed buildings in Glasgow
Listed hospital buildings in Scotland
Hospitals established in 1794
Voluntary hospitals